Sarah Murphy (born 20 October 1986) is a Welsh Labour politician. She was elected as the Member of the Senedd (MS) for the Bridgend constituency at the 2021 Senedd election with a majority of 4,064.

Murphy is the only woman to have won a seat previously held by a man during this election, replacing former First Minister Carwyn Jones, who decided not to stand for re-election.

Early life 
Sarah Murphy was born in East Glamorgan General Hospital in Church Village in 1986, and grew up near Pontypridd with her family. She attended Cardinal Newman R.C. Secondary School and Coleg Morgannwg, before studying English Literature at Reading University from 2005 to 2008.

Career 
After graduating, Murphy moved to Seoul, South Korea to teach English. She then returned to Cardiff as the Head of Events for Welsh Labour between 2009 and 2012, and worked in London for a global property development company.

In 2016, she graduated from the School of Journalism, Media & Communication at Cardiff University with an MA (Distinction) in Digital Media & Society. She was awarded a scholarship from Cardiff University and a grant from the Leathersellers’ Company Charitable Fund to carry out her studies.  

In 2017, as the Research Analyst for Lee Waters AM, Murphy developed and implemented the first opensource, online crowdsourcing platform for a Welsh Assembly Member. Following the 2017 general election, she was appointed as the Senior Communications Manager to Anna McMorrin MP, and then the Senior Advisor to the Shadow Secretary of State for Wales.

Since 2019, Murphy has solely focused on her social welfare and big data research, primarily for the Data Justice Lab at Cardiff University. She researches UK and international governments use of big data and algorithmic-design for public services – with a focus on identifying potential data harms and discrimination against children and families. Her most recent research project investigates data-driven workplace surveillance.

She has written for Welsh political blog Hiraeth about digital poverty and equal access to the internet.

Parliamentary career 

On 7 May 2021, Murphy was elected as Member of Senedd for Bridgend.

Murphy is a member of the Economy, Trade and Rural Affairs Committee. She is also a member of the Equality and Social Justice Committee. Through her committee work, Murphy has worked on inquiries into Debt and the Pandemic,  HGV Driver Shortages, Bovine TB, and Minding the Future: the childcare barriers facing working parents. Murphy is also the Welsh Labour representative for the British-Irish Parliamentary Assembly

Murphy led on the 2022 Chwarae Teg LeadHerShip programme which offered women aged between 16 and 22 the opportunity to shadow politicians in the Welsh Senedd. The LeadHerShip programme aims to ensure that women become better represented in such decision-making roles, provide women with a platform so that their voices are heard and are inspired to see themselves as future leaders. 

In May 2022, Murphy launched the Bridgend Mental Health Pathway,  a directory website for local mental health and well-being support groups across Bridgend.

In 2022, Sarah led on establishing the Senedd Cross Party Group on Digital Rights and Democracy. She is currently elected Chair of the group.

Campaigns 

In December 2021, Murphy hosted the "Pothcawl Regen Dragon's Den" event at the Hi Tide Inn, Porthcawl for the community to share ideas for the upcoming Salt Lake Regeneration. A panel of judges, including special guest judge DJ Lee Jukes, gave feedback, and rated the ideas, from local businesses, organisations and societies in a positive and creative way.

Murphy was quoted as saying "As your representative in the Senedd, I care so much about hearing your ideas for how this should be done – and the regeneration at Salt Lake should be guided by the community."

Murphy documented her walk from Cornelly village to Cynffig Comprehensive Secondary School in Pyle experience, and raise awareness of, the length of time it takes for children to walk to school in all weather conditions following a number of public meetings with the local community 

Using her background in social welfare and big data research, Murphy often draws attention to data justice policy areas within the Senedd Chamber. She has raised questions about how the Police, Crime, Sentencing and Courts Act 2022 could potentially enhance police powers to enforce facial recognition, fingerprint collection, and other biometric surveillance concerns regarding the UK Government proposals for an Online Safety Bill, and raised concerns about biometric data collection of pupils in schools.

Personal life 
Murphy lives in Bridgend.

Prior to being elected, she was the Chair of Sustainable Wales, a charity based in Porthcawl that supports community-based sustainable development. In 2020, she produced the webinar series "Circular Economy: A Design for Life" attended by leading experts from across Wales and the UK.

In March 2020, Murphy founded the Bridgend Coronavirus Support Group that has approximately 12,000 members and has raised money for Bridgend Foodbank and Splice Child and Family in Pyle.

In 2022, Murphy opened up about her experience of suffering from anorexia nervosa at 14 years old during a Senedd debate on mental health. Murphy called for a residential eating disorder unit to be established in Wales.

References 

Female members of the Senedd
Living people
Welsh Labour members of the Senedd
Wales MSs 2021–2026
1986 births
21st-century Welsh women politicians